Richard Humphrey may refer to:

 Richard Humphrey (cricketer, born 1848) (1848–1906), English cricketer
 Richard Humphrey (cricketer, born 1936), English cricketer
 Richard Humphrey (priest), Dean of Hobart

See also
 Richard Humphreys (disambiguation)